National Public Health Centre (NPHC) (Hungarian: Nemzeti Népegészségügyi Központ; NNK) is a Hungarian centralised budgetary body based in Budapest having been established in 2018 as the legal successor of the State Public Health and Medical Officer Service (ÁNTSZ). In December 2018, Hungarian physician Cecília Müller became the Chief Medical Officer.

Governance 
The agency is given authority under the Minister of Human Resources 18/2019. (VI. 6.) EMMI instruction on the Organisational and Operational Regulations (SZMSZ) of the National Centre for Public Health.

Department of Health Administration 
The National Public Health Centre encompasses the Department of Health Administration, an organisational unit under the direct supervision of the National Chief Medical Officer. The administration body has many roles and functions, such as the authorisation and control of the activities of health care providers. 
The tasks undertaken on behalf of the National Chief Medical Officer include, but are not limited to:

References 

Medical and health organisations based in Hungary